Stat-Ease, Inc. is a privately held company producing statistical software in Minneapolis, Minnesota founded by Pat Whitcomb in 1982. The company currently has 14 employees. The company provides software packages for engineers and scientists using design of experiments methods (DOE) for optimizing development of products and processes. It also provides DOE training and consulting services.

History
Stat-Ease was founded by Pat Whitcomb while at General Mills in 1982. He later brought in two of his General Mills colleagues—Tryg Helseth as Programmer and Mark Anderson as Business Manager. Whitcomb and Anderson are Principals of the company today.

The company sold its first software in June 1985. Sales took off in 1987 when the software was described as “incredibly easy to use” in a review of DOE software.

In 1988, the company released its first version of Design-Expert software, which provided the tools for response surface methods (RSM) for process optimization. This package complemented Design-Ease, which handled factorial designs, and also provided statistical tools for optimizing mixtures in the chemical process industries. In 1996, the firm added the features of Design-Ease into Design-Expert version 5 and translated it from DOS to Windows. Both packages are still marketed today.

In 1996, Forbes Magazine said the “new mantra” for process improvement is multivariate testing (MVT) and added: “A Minneapolis software firm, Stat-Ease, sells most of the software these MVT types use.”

Felix Grant, reviewing Design-Expert version 7.1.3 in Scientific Computing Magazine said: “In a mature, well-established product which dominates its market, upgrades should be expected to reflect developing practice and display evolutionary growth rather than piling on attention-seeking gimmicks; and so it is here.... Core functions have been extended usefully... the design editor in Design-Expert (DX) has long been a strong point, providing a central cockpit from which to intuitively refine and test most aspects, but various new control features have now been added to the package, small in themselves but significantly enhancing productive control.”

Statistical design of experiments
Minimum-Run Resolution IV and Minimum-Run Resolution V experimental designs were invented by Pat Whitcomb and Gary Oehlert in 2004. Minimum-run resolution IV (“MR4”) factorial designs estimate all main effects, clear of two-factor or higher interactions, in a minimum of experimental runs. MR4 designs work well for factor screening. Minimum-run resolution V (“MR5”) factorial designs estimate all main effects and two-factor interactions in a minimum of experimental runs. MR5 designs are typically done after screening to a vital few factors, which then need to be studied in more depth in case they interact.

Whitcomb and Oehlert won the Shewell award in 2008 for invention of the half-normal plot of effects for general factorials.

They also developed statistical tools in 2008 to calculate power for a broad range of experimental designs and precision as a power substitute via fraction of design space (FDS) for response surface methods (RSM) and mixture design.

Whitcomb and Anderson have written two non-academic books on DOE; the books include a free educational version of Stat-Ease software.

Applications
Alberto-Culver developed a new line of scrubs using Design-Expert software from Stat-Ease.

Stat-Ease was used by Los Alamos National Laboratory researchers in designing a set of experiments designed to demonstrate the application of model validation techniques to a structural dynamics problem.

Stat-Ease was used by researchers to design experiments to optimize the effects of storage on the physico-chemical, microbiological and sensory quality on bottlegourd-basil leaf juice.

Invitrogen used Stat-Ease Design-Expert software to optimize a cell culture bioproduction system. The researcher states: “This experiment demonstrates how a robotically controlled microbioreactor system can be combined with DoE methods to optimize cell-culture media and feeding strategies. The new process is rich in information and provides a solid understanding of the most influential factors affecting performance of specific cell lines.”

The United States Environmental Protection Agency (EPA) evaluated the physicochemical properties of nine surfactants used in the remediation of perchloroethylene (PCE) in aqueous solutions using a response surface quadratic design model of experiment. Design-Expert software was used to generate the experimental design and perform the analysis. The research provided predictive models for alterations in the physiochemical properties of pore fluid to surfactant enhanced acquifer remediation of PCE.

Researchers investigated the possibility of producing poly-3-hydroxybutyrate (P(3HB)) polyester using corn syrup. The concentrations of the different ingredients were optimized using DOE performed with Design-Expert software.

Researchers at the University of Nottingham demonstrated that the DNA extracted from both green and roasted beans could be used in a restriction fragment length polymorphism (RFLP) based analysis to differentiate between Arabica and Robusta types of coffee. Design-Expert software was used for design of experiments comparing and optimizing yields using a variety of commercial DNA extraction kits.

References

External links
 Stat-Ease official website

Software companies based in Minnesota
Companies based in Minnesota
Software companies of the United States
1982 establishments in the United States
1982 establishments in Minnesota
Software companies established in 1982
Companies established in 1982